Puthar is a village in Israna tehsil in Panipat district in Haryana, India.
Puthar Pin Code is 132107.

Puthar is a medium size village with a population of approximately 2600.

The main attraction of village is Dada Kalisingh.
There are two temples (Than) of Dadajee. One is near Govt. school, for the devotees and second one is in the Haveli of Pt. Parmanand Patwari.
Dr. Munish Kaushik, MBBS of this village is a senior IAS in Delhi. Puthar is a great village of Haryana. All races of people live with good brotherhood.

Villages in Panipat district